Brian Auld is an American professional baseball executive. He is currently the co-president, along with Matthew Silverman, of the Tampa Bay Rays of Major League Baseball (MLB).

Career
Auld received his bachelor's degree in economics and master's degree in education from Stanford University. He obtained his MBA from Harvard Business School. He became the lead teacher and director of development at East Palo Alto Charter School in East Palo Alto, California.

Auld joined the Rays as their director of planning and development in June 2005, reporting into Matthew Silverman, the team's president. He was later promoted to senior vice president of business operations. When Andrew Friedman, the general manager of the Rays, left the team to become president of the Los Angeles Dodgers after the 2014 season, Silverman became the team's new general manager, with Auld being promoted to team president.

Personal life
Auld grew up in Berkeley, California; Scarsdale, New York; Tokyo, Japan; and Dallas, Texas. He graduated from the St. Mark's School of Texas. At Stanford, he was captain of the varsity lacrosse team. He lives in St. Petersburg, Florida. He and his wife, Molly, have three children.

See also
Notable alumni of St. Mark's School of Texas

References

External links

Living people
Sportspeople from Berkeley, California
Stanford University School of Humanities and Sciences alumni
Harvard Business School alumni
Tampa Bay Rays executives
Major League Baseball team presidents
Year of birth missing (living people)
Stanford Graduate School of Education alumni
St. Mark's School (Texas) alumni
Tampa Bay Rowdies executives